The Where We Are Tour was the third headlining concert tour by English-Irish boy band One Direction, in support of their third studio album, Midnight Memories (2013). It marks the group's first all-stadium tour with an average attendance of 49,848. The tour began on 25 April 2014 in Bogotá, Colombia and concluded on 5 October 2014 in Miami, Florida. Australian pop rock band, 5 Seconds of Summer, served as the opening act for the European and North American dates.

The tour was the highest-grossing tour of 2014 and the highest-grossing tour of all time by a vocal group. It is One Direction's most attended and highest-grossing tour to date, mobilising 3,439,560 fans and $290,178,452 in revenue. This is the band's last full-length tour with Zayn Malik, before his departure during On the Road Again Tour in 2015.

Development 
On 16 May 2013, the tour was announced by One Direction during a press conference at Wembley Stadium, during which the band revealed their first stadium tour would kickoff in Colombia in April 2014, with dates being announced for South America, UK, and Ireland. At the event, band member Louis Tomlinson described their upcoming album as being "rockier" and "edgier" than the music they have previously released.

Tickets for 8 shows in the UK and Ireland went on sale on 25 May 2013, with several dates selling out in minutes, leading to extra show dates being announced. All tickets from the first show of the tour in Bogotá sold out in one day, nearly a year prior to the concert date. On 19 September, 10 shows for the European leg were announced and additional shows in Dublin, Manchester, and London were added, with tickets going on sale the following week on September 28th.

During an appearance on Good Morning America on 26 November 2013 to promote the release of their third album, the band announced 21 dates for the North American leg of the tour, with tickets going on sale on 7 December.

In March 2014, the Australian pop rock band, 5 Seconds of Summer, was announced as the opening act for the European and North American dates, having previously opened for One Direction during their Take Me Home Tour the year before. In the midst of their tour, the band performed at BBC Radio 1's Big Weekend in Glasgow on 24 May 2014, and flew back to Dublin the same day for their second show at Croke Park that night. They also opened the second night of the iHeartRadio Music Festival on 20 September, at the MGM Grand Garden Arena in Las Vegas. In June 2014, it was reported that One Direction had raised £600,000 for the UK charity Stand Up to Cancer, after donating 50p for each ticket sold from their UK and Ireland tour to the charity.

Recording 

The 28 and 29 June 2014 shows at San Siro in Milan, Italy were recorded into a concert film. The film was released on 11 and 12 October 2014 in select theatres worldwide before its home media release. The theatrical version had a runtime of 96 minutes. It was released on DVD in December 2014, and features the entire concert and additional content including backstage footage.

Set list 
This set list is representative of the show on 25 April 2014 in Bogotá. It is not representative of all concerts for the duration of the tour.

 "Midnight Memories"
 "Little Black Dress"
 "Kiss You"
 "Why Don't We Go There"
 "Rock Me"
 "Don't Forget Where You Belong"
 "Live While We're Young"
 "C'mon, C'mon"
 "Right Now"
 "Through the Dark"
 "Happily"
 "Little Things"
 "Moments"
 "Strong"
 "Better Than Words"
 "Alive"
 "One Thing"
 "Diana"
 "What Makes You Beautiful"
Encore
 "You & I"
 "Story of My Life"
 "Little White Lies"
 "Best Song Ever"

Shows

Cancelled shows

See also
 List of highest-grossing concert tours

References

External links

 Tour announcement

2014 concert tours
One Direction concert tours